Sailor's Creek Battlefield Historical State Park is a  state park near Rice, Virginia, located mostly in Amelia County with a small portion in Prince Edward County.  It includes a portion of the landmarked Sayler's Creek Battlefield, an area of  that was the site of the April 6, 1865 Battle of Sayler's Creek, one of the last major engagements in the Eastern Theater of the war involving Confederate General-in-Chief Robert E. Lee (1807-1870). The battle occurred during his week-long retreat to the southwest in the final Appomattox campaign from the fallen Confederate capital at  Richmond and nearby Petersburg, three days before his surrender at Appomattox Court House to Union Army General-in-Chief Ulysses S. Grant (1822-1885), which effectively ended the American Civil War (1861-1865).

It is likely that some of this state historical park established in 1985 by the Commonwealth of Virginia is not included in the four separated parcels that were landmarked.

Besides the historical Hillsman House, a visitors center including exhibits with artifacts and memorabilia, park ranger talks and lectures, walking trails, and interpretive plaques, the park also offers such amenities as picnic tables and barbecue grills available for use.

The Hillsman House on the site was used as a field hospital during and after the battle, and is open to visitors in the summer and by request.  The park also occasionally hosts "living history" events with Civil War soldier and civilian reenactors.

The park name appears to be a misspelling of Saylor, a farmer after whose land and the stream for which the Battle of Sayler's Creek was afterwards later named in 1865.  Some official records such as those of the National Historic Landmark program refer to this park as being named the Sayler's Creek Battlefield State Park.

Gallery

See also
 List of Virginia state parks
 List of Virginia state forests

References

External links

Sailor's Creek Battlefield State Park web page
Overton-Hillsman House - Wayside Marker

State parks of Virginia
Parks in Amelia County, Virginia
Museums in Amelia County, Virginia
Historic house museums in Virginia
American Civil War museums in Virginia
Battlefields of the Eastern Theater of the American Civil War
Protected areas established in 1985
1985 establishments in Virginia